Ankonetta is an extinct genus of mid-sized anatid birds that lived during the Miocene. Its holotype was found in the Early Miocene (Santacrucian), Santa Cruz Formation in Argentina. The type species is A. larriestrai.

Etymology 
The genus name is derived from Aónikenk, a group of indigenous Tehuelche-speaking people from Patagonia. Anko means "father" and netta is derived from Greek, meaning "duck". The species epithet refers to Claudio Larriestra, who studied the Pinturas Formation, another important fossiliferous formation of Patagonia.

References

Bibliography 
 

†Ankonetta
Miocene birds of South America
Santacrucian
Neogene Argentina
Fossils of Argentina
Fossil taxa described in 2010
Prehistoric bird genera